Ivar Aleksander "Iivari" Partanen (16 July 1880 – 8 April 1947) was a Finnish gymnast who competed at the 1908 Summer Olympics.

He was part of the Viipurin Reipas team that won the gymnastics Finnish national championship in 1903, 1906 and 1912. He was nominated into their honorary legion.

Sources

References 

1880 births
1947 deaths
Finnish male artistic gymnasts
Olympic gymnasts of Finland
Gymnasts at the 1908 Summer Olympics
People from Viipuri Province (Grand Duchy of Finland)
20th-century Finnish people